Alain Koffi (born 23 November 1983) is a French professional basketball player for Le Mans Sarthe of the LNB Pro A.

Professional career
Koffi was the French League French Player's MVP, in 2009.

Koffi spent the 2019-20 season with BCM Gravelines-Dunkerque and averaged 8 points and 5 rebounds per game. He initially signed a two-month contract with Le Mans Sarthe, however, on October 8, 2020, he extended his contract until the end of the season.

French national team 
Koffi was a member of the senior French national basketball team.

Honors 
Le Mans

French Cup Winner: 2
2004 2009
French League Champion: 1
2006

References

External links
Euroleague.net Profile
Eurobasket.com Profile
Draftexpress.com Profile

1983 births
Living people
2010 FIBA World Championship players
BCM Gravelines players
Centers (basketball)
Élan Béarnais players
French expatriate basketball people in Spain
French men's basketball players
French sportspeople of Ivorian descent
Joventut Badalona players
Le Mans Sarthe Basket players
Liga ACB players
Power forwards (basketball)